Revelation is an American doom metal band from Maryland.

Biography

Revelation started in 1986 by singer/guitarist John Brenner and drummer Steve Branagan. After numerous demos they were featured on Rise Above Records compilation Dark Passages. They put out one album with Rise Above before signing with Hellhound Records. They put out two albums with Hellhound before breaking up. In 2003 Miskatonic Records released Frozen Masque, which featured two demos from 1996 as well as live material. The band has played numerous shows since 2003. Some members of the band formed Against Nature in 2004.

In 2007, Leaf Hound Records re-released Never Comes Silence and announced plans to reissue both Salvation's Answer and an unreleased album. Also in 2007, past line-ups performed at Baltimore's Doom or Be Doomed festival. Several weeks after the Doom or be Doomed Festival Revelation reformed with a "new' line up including John Brenner on guitars and vocals, Josh Hart on guitars, Bert Hall, Jr on bass guitar, and Steve Branagan on Drums. In addition, Brenner, Hall and Branagan will continue to release music and tour as Against Nature.

In 2008, Revelation released their fourth album, Release.

Discography

Albums
Salvation's Answer (Rise Above Records 1991)
Never Comes Silence (Hellhound Records 1992)
...Yet So Far (Hellhound Records 1995)
Frozen Masque (Miskatonic Records 2003)
Unreleased Album (Leaf Hound Records 2008; recorded in 1988)
Release (Leaf Hound Records 2008)
For the Sake of No One (Shadow Kingdom Records 2009)
Inner Harbor (Shadow Kingdom Records 2013)

Reissue
Never Comes Silence (Leaf Hound Records 2007)
Salvation's Answer (Leaf Hound Records 2007)
Revelation (reissue of 'Unreleased' The Church Within Records 2009; recorded in 1988)

References

American doom metal musical groups
Heavy metal musical groups from Maryland
American stoner rock musical groups
Musical groups established in 1986
Musical quartets
Musical groups disestablished in 1996
Musical groups reestablished in 2003
1986 establishments in Maryland
Hellhound Records artists